Toatoa or Opape is a small settlement in the Ōpōtiki District of the Bay of Plenty Region on New Zealand's North Island.

It accommodates cyclists using the Motu Trail cycleway.

Marae

Opape Marae and Muriwai meeting house is a traditional meeting place of the Whakatōhea hapū of Ngāi Tamahaua or Ngāi Tama.

In October 2020, the Government committed $744,574 from the Provincial Growth Fund to upgrade the marae and two other Whakatōhea marae, creating 30 jobs.

References

Ōpōtiki District
Populated places in the Bay of Plenty Region